Boris Petrovich Khimichev (12 January 1933 – 14 September 2014) was a Ukrainian-born Russian actor who was named a People's Artist of Russia in 1993.

Khimichev worked at the Mayakovsky Theatre between 1964 and 1982. After his divorce from Tatyana Doronina, the theatre's leading actress, Khimichev joined the troupe of the Mossovet Theatre. He died at the age of 81 from a brain tumor.

Selected filmography

1968: The Sixth of July as Telegrafist
1969: The Snow Maiden (Снегурочка)  as Misghir
1974: The Silence of Dr. Evans (Молчание доктора Ивенса) as intelligence agent
1977: One-Two, Soldiers Were Going... (Аты-баты, шли солдаты... ) as Yuri Ivanovich
1978: Youth With Us (Молодость с нами) as Uralskiy
1980: Detective as Kolya Palyony
1981: True of Lieutenant Klimov as Admiral
1983: The Ballad of the Valiant Knight Ivanhoe (Баллада о доблестном рыцаре Айвенго) (TV Mini-Series) as Brian De Bois-Guilbert
1984: TASS Is Authorized to Declare... (ТАСС уполномочен заявить...) as Michael Welsh
1986: Boris Godunov (Борис Годунов) as Vasily Mosalsky
1988: Gardes-Marines, ahead! (Гардемарины, вперёд!) as Prince Cherkassky
1990: La batalla de los Tres Reyes as Zakhary Fluge
2013: Yeralash (Ералаш) (TV Series) as grandfather
2014: House with lily (Дом с ли́лиями) (TV Series) as Rostopchin

References

External links

1933 births
2014 deaths
Soviet male actors
Russian male actors
People's Artists of Russia
Recipients of the Order of Honour (Russia)
Russian male television actors
Deaths from brain tumor
Russian male voice actors
Moscow Art Theatre School alumni
People from Khmelnytskyi Oblast
Deaths from cancer in Russia